The Texas Film Commission is a state agency of Texas, under the oversight of the Governor of Texas. Its headquarters are in Suite 3.410 in the Texas Insurance Building in Downtown Austin.

References

External links

 Texas Film Commission

State agencies of Texas
Film commissions in the United States